The Hongkong Canton & Macao Steamboat Company was a British merchant shipping and maritime trading company founded in 1865 in the Crown colony of Hong Kong.

History 

The Hongkong Canton & Macao Steamboat Company was founded on 20 October 1865 in Hong Kong by a collection of people tied to the shipping industry in order to support the market for regional ferry transport in the Canton area. The company was founded in the same year as the founding of the Companies Registry which granted it the company number 2, only behind the British Traders' Insurance Company.

The HCMSCo was one of the major shipping companies that participated in the Pearl River and China trade together with the China Navigation Company, China Merchants Steam Navigation Company and Jardine Matheson's Indo-China Steam Navigation Company since its creation in the 1860s. CMCo and the HCMSCo had entered into a collaboration to jointly carry out business in the area which continued into the early 1900s.

With the opening of the West River Trade in 1897, HCMSCo together with the China Navigation Company and Jardine Matheson's Indo-China Steam Navigation Company, partnered together to open the new trade which became active from around 1897 to 1917 following the opening of several Treaty Ports like Wuzhou, Sanshui and Jiangmen to foreign trade in 1897. The West River trade declined with the advent of the Kowloon Canton Railway.

HCMSCo was dissolved on 28 April 1958.

Fleet

List of HCMSCo ships 
The following is an incomplete list of the HKC&MSCo fleet. A full illustrated fleet list has been published by H.W. Dick and S.A. Kentwell (see references below).

See also 
 China Navigation Company
 China trade

References 

Shipping companies of Hong Kong
Transport companies established in 1865
Trading companies
1865 establishments in the British Empire
Transport companies of Hong Kong
Trading companies of Hong Kong
History of Guangzhou
History of Hong Kong
British Hong Kong
Defunct companies of Hong Kong